is a Japanese actor, tarento, and musician, originally from Moji-ku, Kitakyūshū, Fukuoka Prefecture. He is known for his roles as Shin Asuka/Ultraman Dyna in Ultraman Dyna and as the leader of the musical units Shuchishin and Aladdin. As a member of Shuchishin and Aladdin, he appears regularly on the variety show Quiz! Hexagon II. Tsuruno married his former stylist  in 2003. He named his albums after his daughters, and after recording his first album and before the birth of his third daughter he mused naming an album after his son such that it was called .

Tsuruno is currently represented with Ohta Production.

Filmography

TV dramas

Discography

Albums

Singles

Personal life
Tsuruno is a Roman Catholic.

References

External links
Personal blog 

1975 births
Living people
20th-century Roman Catholics
21st-century Japanese singers
21st-century Japanese male singers
21st-century Roman Catholics
Japanese male actors
Japanese Roman Catholics
Musicians from Fukuoka Prefecture
People from Kitakyushu